Henryk Skromny (24 December 1926 – 16 November 1962) was a Polish footballer. He played in seven matches for the Poland national football team from 1947 to 1952.

References

External links
 

1926 births
1962 deaths
Polish footballers
Poland international footballers
Place of birth missing
Association footballers not categorized by position